Reyhaneh (also Romanized as Reyḩāneh; also known as Rehāna, Rehāneh, and Reyḩān) is a village in Abdoliyeh-ye Gharbi Rural District, in the Central District of Ramshir County, Khuzestan Province, Iran. At the 2006 census, its population was 368, in 71 families.

References 

Populated places in Ramshir County